Horwitz is a surname, current among Ashkenazi Jews. It is derived from the Yiddish pronunciation of the name of the town of Hořovice in Bohemia. For detailed historical background see the Horowitz page .

Notable people with the surname include:
 Arnold Horwitz (later Arnold Horween), American football player for Harvard Crimson and in the NFL
 Bella Horwitz, 18th century Bohemian writer
 Bernhard Horwitz (1807-1885), German chess player
 Brian Horwitz (born 1982), American major league baseball outfielder
 Jacob H. Horwitz (1892–1992), American businessman, philanthropist and fashion innovator.
 Jerome Lester Horwitz (1903 – 1952),  Curly Howard, of the Three Stooges
 David Horwitz (born 1994), Australian rugby union player
 Kai Horwitz (born 1998), Chilean Olympic alpine skier
 Maksymilian Horwitz, aka Henryk Walecki (1877–1937), leader and theoretician of the Polish communist movement
 Morton Horwitz (born 1938), legal historian and law professor
 Moses Harry Horwitz, a.k.a. Moe Howard, of the Three Stooges
 Phineas Jonathan Horwitz (1822–1904), former Surgeon General of the United States Navy
 Ralph Horwitz (later "Ralph Horween), American football player for Harvard Crimson and in the NFL
 Ronald Horwitz (born 1934), known as Ronald Harwood
 Samuel Horwitz, a.k.a. Shemp Howard of the Three Stooges
 Steven Horwitz (born 1964), American economist
 Susan B. Horwitz 1955 – 2014), American computer scientist 
 Susan Band Horwitz, American biochemist
 Tony Horwitz (1958–2019), American journalist
 William Horwitz (1918 – 2006), analytical chemist, formerly at the US Food and Drug Administration
 Yosef Yozel Horwitz, rabbi

See also
Horwitz Publications, an Australian publisher
Louisa Gross Horwitz Prize
Horowitz
Horovitz
Horvitz
Hurwitz

Jewish surnames
Yiddish-language surnames